H. Francis Kennedy (July 7, 1918 – April 29, 1995) was a former Republican member of the Pennsylvania House of Representatives.

Appointed on the Legislative Budget and Finance Committee (1969–70) and Pennsylvania Commission on Interstate Cooperation (1971–74), he was an unsuccessful candidate for reelection in the House of Representatives in a general election in 1974.

References

Republican Party members of the Pennsylvania House of Representatives
1918 births
1995 deaths
20th-century American politicians